Hey Rube may refer to:

Hey, Rube!, a circus slang term
Hey Rube!, a 1928 silent film directed by George B. Seitz
Hey Rube (book), a book by Hunter S. Thompson, published 2004
Hey, Rube! (band), a British electronica group formed by Steve Cobby and Stephen Mallinder